Florida station or Florida Station may refer to:

Bellavista de La Florida metro station, a station on the Santiago Metro in Chile
Florida (Barcelona Metro), a station on the Barcelona Metro in Catalonia, Spain
Florida Station, Northern Territory, a former cattle station in Arnhem Land, Australia
Florida station (RTD), a station on the RTD rail system in Aurora, Colorado, United States
Mount Florida railway station, a station on the Glasgow suburban railway network in Scotland, United Kingdom
Strata Florida railway station, a former station on the Carmarthen to Aberystwyth line in Wales, United Kingdom

See also
:Category:Radio stations in Florida
:Category:Railway stations in Florida
:Category:Television stations in Florida